Piz Mez is a mountain of the Oberhalbstein Alps, located south of Savognin in the canton of Graubünden.

References

External links
 Piz Mez on Hikr

Mountains of Switzerland
Mountains of Graubünden
Mountains of the Alps
Two-thousanders of Switzerland
Surses